Nikyho velebné dobrodružství is a 1920 Czechoslovak comedy film directed by Evzen Nicolsen.

Cast
Anny Ondra
Jan Zelenka ...  Priest

External links 
 

1920 films
1920 comedy films
Czechoslovak black-and-white films
Czech silent films
Czechoslovak comedy films
Czech comedy films